Paul Butorac (born November 25, 1983) is an American former professional basketball player. 
He currently coaches Lilac City Legends of the American Basketball Association (ABA) .

College statistics

|-
| style="text-align:left;"| 2003–04
| style="text-align:left;"| Eastern Washington
| 30 || 2 || 12.3 || .585 || .200 || .632|| 2.5 ||0.5 || 0.2 ||0.4 || 4.0
|-
| style="text-align:left;"| 2004–05
| style="text-align:left;"| Eastern Washington
| 26 || 2 || 15.9 || .516 || .333 || .653|| 3.0 ||0.7  || 0.2 || 0.3 || 5.1
|-
| style="text-align:left;"| 2005–06
| style="text-align:left;"| Eastern Washington
| 29 || 28 || 24.2 || .573 || .438 || .610|| 5.4 ||1.4  || 0.4 || 1.8 || 10.3
|-
| style="text-align:left;"| 2006–07
| style="text-align:left;"| Eastern Washington
| 28 || 28 || 28.0 || .640 || .238 || .585|| 6.7 ||1.7  || 0.5 || 1.0 || 14.4
|-
|- class="sortbottom"
! style="text-align:center;" colspan=2| Career
! 113 || 60 || 20.1 || .593 || .313 || .608 || 4.4 || 1.1 ||0.3 || 0.9 || 8.5

Career statistics 

|-
| align="left" | 2007–08
| align="left" | Boulogne-sur-Mer
|  6||    ||20.3  || .441 || .286 ||.824  || 4.2 || 1.0 ||1.0 || 0.3 ||11.3
|-
| align="left" | 2007–08
| align="left" | Stal Ostrow Wielkopolski
|  2||    || 5.5 || .500 ||.000  ||.000  || 2.0 || 0.0 ||0.5 || 0.0 ||3.0
|-
| align="left" | 2007–08
| align="left" | Colorado 14ers
|  3||0  ||5.4  ||.333  ||.000  ||.000  || 0 || 0.67 || 0.0 || 0.0 ||0.67
|-
| align="left" | 2008–09
| align="left" | TTU/Kalev
|  6||    ||13.2  ||.483  ||.125  || .538 || 2.3 || 0.3 || 0.0||0.3  ||6.0
|-
| align="left" | 2008–09
| align="left" | Niigata
| 42 || 41 || 31.0 || .557 || .000 || .564 || 9.0 || 1.3 || 0.9 || 1.0 ||  16.0
|-
| align="left" |  2010–11
| align="left" | Akita
| 42 || 39 || 26.4 || .541 || .143 || .548 || 7.7 || 1.2 || 0.3 || 0.5 ||  14.4
|-
| align="left" |  2011–12
| align="left" | Takamatsu
| 44 || 43 || 33.3 || .423 || .233 || .644 || 8.0 || 1.4 || 0.4 || 0.4 ||  17.3
|-
| align="left" |  2012–13
| align="left" | Yokohama
| 14 ||  || 19.3 || .520 || .409 || .679 || 4.6 || 0.5 || 0.1 || 0.4 ||  10.5
|-
| align="left" | 2012–13
| align="left" | Toyota Tsusho
|  ||  ||  ||  ||  ||  ||  ||  ||  ||  ||   
|-
| align="left" | 2013–14
| align="left" | BC Yambol
| 8 || 5 || 24.1 ||.487  ||.263  || .529 ||5.62  || 0.75 ||0.38  ||0.62  || 11.00  
|-

| align="left" |  2013–14
| align="left" | TGI D-Rise
| 16 ||  || 28.3 || .557 || .286 || .639 || 11.0 || 1.9 || 0.6 || 0.8 ||  16.6
|-
| align="left" |  2014–15
| align="left" | Wakayama
|53 ||37 ||29.1 ||.418 ||.279 ||.643 ||7.4 ||1.7 ||0.5 ||0.5 ||15.0
|-
| align="left" | 2015–16
| align="left" | Saitama
| 14||7 ||20.7 ||.436 ||.279 ||.652 ||6.8 || 1.4||0.4 ||0.9 || 10.6
|-

| align="left" | 2015–16
| align="left" | Fubon Braves
|2  || 2 ||  ||.367 ||.273  ||.250  ||13.5  || 2 || 0 ||0.5  ||9.5
|-
| align="left" | 2015–16
| align="left" | Vampire
|4  ||  ||34.0  ||.316 ||.154  ||.600  ||7.5  || 1.8|| 0.3 ||2.3  ||9.0
|-
| align="left" | 2015–16
| align="left" | Rayos de Hermosillo
| 59 ||56  || 24.9 ||.597  || .244 ||.636  ||8.12  ||0.80  || 0.31 || 0.39 ||  10.69 
|-
| align="left" | 2016–17
| align="left" | Kumamoto
| 60 ||  || 14.8 || .487 || .267 || .656 || 3.8 || 0.9 || 0.3 || 0.8 ||  14.8
|-

Playoff games

|-
| align="left" | 2010–2011
| align="left" | Akita
|  2||    || 18.5|| .500 ||.000  ||.400  || 5.5 || 0.0 ||0.0 || 0.0 ||8.0
|-

External links
Akita Highlights
Eastern Washington bio
Stats in Japan

References

1983 births
Living people
Akita Northern Happinets players
American expatriate basketball people in Bulgaria
American expatriate basketball people in Estonia
American expatriate basketball people in France
American expatriate basketball people in Japan
American expatriate basketball people in Latvia
American expatriate basketball people in Mexico
American expatriate basketball people in Poland
American expatriate basketball people in Taiwan
American men's basketball players
Basketball players from Washington (state)
Colorado 14ers players
BC Tallinn Kalev players
BC Yambol players
BK Liepājas Lauvas players
Eastern Washington Eagles men's basketball players
Kagawa Five Arrows players
Korvpalli Meistriliiga players
Kumamoto Volters players
Niigata Albirex BB players
Rayos de Hermosillo players
Saitama Broncos players
TGI D-Rise players
Toyotsu Fighting Eagles Nagoya players
Wakayama Trians players
Yokohama B-Corsairs players
People from Medical Lake, Washington
Centers (basketball)
Power forwards (basketball)